'Doublecross' is a 1956 British crime film directed by Anthony Squire and starring Donald Houston, Fay Compton and William Hartnell.  It was also known as Queer Fish.

Plot

The story takes place in a Cornish fishing town in the 1950s.

Local fisherman assemble in a local pub, apparently to practise their bell-ringing. They are approached by two foreign men (and one woman) who are interested in making use of a boat and ask questions about going to the French coast.

Albert Pascoe agrees to take them to France for £100, half paid in advance. They sail off on a moonlit night on a trip that will take until the next afternoon.

Meanwhile, back in the village, Albert's smaller rowing boat is found with four large poached salmon in it. A friend hides them from the authorities.

Police get involved when it is revealed that one of the foreign men is a murderer.

Albert overhears the two foreign men and woman (wife of one of the men) discussing that one of the men Dmitri Krassin had to kill a man in England while stealing UK state secrets.
After this, Albert decides to doublecross the three tricking them by altering the boat's compass and landing them back somewhere on the coast of England, which he knows resembles the coast of France.

In mid-channel the foreign men plot to kill Albert after he drops them in France. He is forewarned of this by the woman Anna and attacks them as soon as they land, trying to wrestle a gun from Krassin. He spits in Clifford's face. Anna has not left the boat and when he returns to the boat they set off to sea again. Anna discusses her home country of Hungary where her father fished on Lake Balaton
and Anna and Albert begin to fall in love.

When quizzed by the police Albert reveals that he dropped the spies at Lands End, England knowing that they could not get off the beach and had no idea that it was not France and defends Anna as being completely innocent.

The police refuse to charge Albert with illegally catching a salmon just as he returned to the harbour. Albert and Anna decide to try to live together as a couple.

Cast
 Donald Houston - Albert Pascoe
 Fay Compton - Alice Pascoe
 Anton Diffring - Dmitri Krassin a spy
 Allan Cuthbertson - Clifford, a spy
 Delphi Lawrence - Anna Krassin
 William Hartnell - Herbert Whiteway, the landowner
 Kenneth Cope - Jeffrey of the Coast Guard (his first credited role in a film)
 Colin Douglas - Police Sergeant
 Robert Shaw - Ernest, an off-duty policeman who fills in for Albert in his bell-ringing role (Shaw's first film role albeit minor)
 Frank Lawton - Chief Constable
 Harry Towb - the pub landlord

References

External links

1956 films
1950s crime thriller films
British crime films
Cold War spy films
Films set in Cornwall
Seafaring films
1950s English-language films
1950s British films
British black-and-white films